Nicola Ciccone is a Canadian francophone singer-songwriter, novelist and writer of Italian origin. His songs have been mainly in French but also in English, Italian, and Spanish. He has released 13 albums, which have been nominated for many ADISQ, CRIA, and Juno Prizes. He has also authored two novels (L'Étoile enfant and Dans les yeux d'Ophelia) and an autobiography (Cuore).

Biography
Ciccone was born very prematurely, with doctors giving him just 5% of survival, as he recounts in his autobiography, Cuore. Born to parents from Abruzzo, in southern Italy, he lived in the Mile-Ex part of Montreal, which was a very poor area of Montreal's Little Italy area. When he was very young, his father died. Nicola was a victim of bullying at school.

Nicola studied child psychology at Montreal's McGill University. in 1998, he won "Ma Première" held annually for upcoming Canadian artists at Montreal's Place des Arts and soon signed a record.contract He released his debut album, L'Opéra du Mendiant in 1998, which got gold. He then released a number of albums and had chart success with a number of singles.

In 2017, he became a spokesman for Quebec Autism Federation. He also became one of the spokesmen for fondation Charles Bruneau in 2019 and the spokesman for Trouble craniocérébral TCC in 2020.

In September 2021 Ciccone released his 13th album, the musical project "Gratitude." Its release was followed by an important tour. The 12-song record was written during the lockdown, which makes it both touching and universal.

Awards and recognition

1998: Winner of "Ma Premiere" at Place des Arts
2003: Felix Award during the ADISQ Gala for Best Sing for "J't'aime tout court"
2007: Felix Award for Best Male Singer
2009: Felix Award for Best Male Singer

Discography

Albums
1999: L'Opéra du mendiant
2001: Noctambule
2003: J't'aime tout court
2006: Nous serons six milliards
2008: Storyteller
2010: Imaginaire
2012: Pour toi
2013: Il sognatore
2014: Les Incontournables
2016: Esprit libre
2017: Les Immortelles
2019: Le long chemin
2021: Gratitude

Songs and videos
(Selective)
"J't'aime tout court"
"Chanson pour Marie"
"Ordinary Man"
"Innamorati Noi"*
"Urgence"
"Pour toi"
"Celle que tu n es pas"
"Le petit monde"
"Oh toi mon père"
"Le long chemin"
"La solitude à deux"
"Pleure"
"Le petit monde"
"Nous serons six milliards"
"Little girl"
"Superman est une femme"
"Sache"
"Inconditionnel"
"Ils ont fermé le monde"
"Je veux pas mourir avant d être mort"
"GAFA"

Bibliography
2013: L'Étoile enfant (novel, Editions Librex/Matita)
2015:  Dans les yeux d'Ophelia (novel, Editions Librex/Matita)
2017: Cuore (autobiography, Editions Libre Expression)

References

External links

Quebec Info Musique: Nicola Ciccone

Living people
Canadian singer-songwriters
Singers from Quebec
Year of birth missing (living people)